This is a list of the German Media Control Top100 Singles Chart number-ones of 2001.

Number-one hits by week

See also
List of number-one hits (Germany)

Notes

References

External links
 charts.de
 germancharts.com

Number-one hits
Germany
2001
2001